Michael Lyons (born 8 December 1951) is an English former footballer in the 1970s and 1980s. He is most famous as captain of Everton during this period.

Early life
Lyons was educated at the all-boys' De La Salle School in Liverpool. He was an Everton fan and his dream was to play for the football club.

Club career

Everton
Lyons signed as a professional at Everton in 1970 after having served an apprenticeship at the club. He made his first team debut in the Football League First Division in 1971. Utilized mostly as a defender, Lyons would be pushed forward into an attacking role in the last 10 minutes of a game.

Lyons was not considered the most technically gifted of players but more than made up for it by his desire to play for Everton, the club he supported when he was a boy. Lyons' versatility made him a very useful player; he could play anywhere down the middle and was once Everton's top goalscorer.

Sheffield Wednesday
Lyons moved to Sheffield Wednesday in 1982. He appeared for them 129 times, scoring 12 goals. Lyons helped Wednesday win promotion to the Football League First Division. He was appointed as Youth Team Coach for the 1984/85 season.

International career
Lyons won two England "B" caps in 1978.

Managerial career

Grimsby Town
Lyons became player-manager of Grimsby Town in 1985, replacing David Booth. The side could never get above mid-table and finished 15th. The 1986–87 season began well and most of the season was spent in the top half and on the fringes of the play-off race. However, a run of 8 losses and 2 draws in the last 10 games meant that Grimsby fell from 8th to 21st and the first of two consecutive relegations.

Nova Scotia Clippers
In 1991, he was an assistant coach with the Nova Scotia Clippers of the Canadian Soccer League and also appeared as a player in six matches, scoring once.

Canberra Cosmos
Lyons was appointed coach of Canberra Cosmos in Australia's National Soccer League in 1995. A 9th-place finish in his first season showed sporadic promise, but this was not maintained as the club finished last the following season.

Stirling Lions
Lyons spent five years as the coach of the Stirling Lions in the Football West Premier League in Perth, Western Australia. He was dismissed in April 2011.

Cockburn City
He was appointed as manager of Cockburn City in 2011 and his first came against Perth Soccer Club. He was sacked in July 2012 leaving the club in fourth position, three points behind the league leaders.

UWA Nedlands FC
Lyons was appointed as manager of UWA Nedlands Football club in 2013 for the upcoming 13/14 season. A mixed season saw the first team finishing 7th.

Legacy
It was at Everton that Lyons is best remembered and revered for his commitment and dedication to "the cause". Lyons famously dived under Norman Hunter's boot to score from inside the six-yard box in a league game against Leeds United.

Honours
League Cup: Everton 1977, runners up
Sheffield Wednesday Promotion to League Division One  1984

References

External links
 Mick Lyons Interview

1951 births
Living people
Association football defenders
English footballers
England B international footballers
England under-23 international footballers
Everton F.C. players
Grimsby Town F.C. players
Sheffield Wednesday F.C. players
English football managers
Grimsby Town F.C. managers
Brunei national football team managers
Expatriate football managers in Brunei
Footballers from Liverpool
Nova Scotia Clippers players